Louisa So Yuk Wa (Born 16 January 1968 in Hong Kong) is a Hong Kong actress in drama and TV series. She is considered the "Cooking Mistress" of Hong Kong after winning the comedy cooking show Beautiful Cooking. In August 2009, she travelled by train across the United States, during which time she met Guardian journalist Douglas Rogers. After a brief break in 2009, she unexpectedly returned to acting in 2014 as the protagonist in the TVB drama Rear Mirror, a role that brought her wide critical acclaim, after the show received high viewership ratings.

In 2020, Louisa tied the knot with her long-time partner Poon Chan Leung, a Hong Kong actor.

Filmography

Television series

Drama
1989: Grease 油脂
1989: Such a Lovely Bastille Day 某一年的七月十四日
1989: Biloxi Blues 衝上雲霄
1989: The Normal Heart 常在我心間
1990: How to Succeed in Business without Really Trying 登龍有術
1990: Tin Hau - Goddess of Heaven 天后
1990: Goddess Kwun Yum and Virgin Maria 生觀音與瑪莉亞
1990: Terry Nova 光榮之旅
1991: One of the Lucky Ones (Re-run) 伴我同行(重演)
1991: Fou Lei & Fou Tsong 傅雷與傅聰
1991: The Government Inspector 欽差大臣
1991: Deadly Ecstasy 神火
1991: Orchards 情有獨鍾
1992: Nothing Scared 百無禁忌
1992: I Have a Date with Spring 我和春天有個約會
1992: Noises Off 蝦碌戲班
1992: A Flea in Her Ear 橫衝直撞偷錯情
1992: House of Blue Leaves 藍葉之屋
1992: M Butterfly 蝴蝶君
1993: M Butterfly (Re-run) 蝴蝶君
1993: I Have a Date with Spring (Re-run) 我和春天有個約會
1993: The Legend of the Mad Phoenix 南海十三郎
1993: King Lear 李爾王
1993: Guan Hanqing 關漢卿
1993: The Trial 審判
1994: Amadeus 莫札特之死
1994: Major Barbara 芭巴拉少校
1995: I Have a Date with Spring 我和春天有個約會
1996: That's Entertainment 播音情人
1997: The Mad Phoenix 南海十三郎
1997: That's Entertainment 播音情人
2000: Noises Off 蝦碌戲班
2002: Love in a Fallen City 新傾城之戀
2002: Between Life and Death 生死界
2003: A Serenade 寒江釣雪
2005: Superman Forever 你今日拯救o左地球未呀?
2005: Love in a Fallen City 05 新傾城之戀 05
2006: Love in a Fallen City 06 新傾城之戀 '06 傾情再遇
2007: The Peach Blossom Land 暗戀桃花源
2012: Rabbit Hole 心洞
2013: I Have a Date with Spring 我和春天有個約會（春天舞台重演版）
2013: The Mad Phoenix (Re-run) 南海十三郎（重演版）
2013: 18/F Block C 十八樓C座
2015: The Amahs 金蘭姐妹
2015: Into the Womb 胎內
2015: Le Dieu Du Carnage (Re-run) 狂揪夫妻 （重演）
2017: The Truth 謊言
2018: The Truth (Re-run) 謊言

Film

1994: I Have a Date with Spring 我和春天有個約會
1995: Paradise Hotel
1995: The Umbrella Story
1997 The Mad Phoenix 南海十三郎
2007: It's a Wonderful Life 心想事成
2018: Staycation

References

External links
TVBSpace News

Hong Kong television actresses
Hong Kong food writers
1968 births
Living people
TVB veteran actors
Alumni of The Hong Kong Academy for Performing Arts
20th-century Hong Kong actresses
21st-century Hong Kong actresses
Hong Kong film actresses
Reality cooking competition winners